Allodiaptomus is a genus of copepods in the family Diaptomidae, containing the following species:
Allodiaptomus intermedius Reddy, 1987
Allodiaptomus mieni Dang & Ho, 1985
Allodiaptomus mirabilipes Kiefer, 1936
Allodiaptomus raoi Kiefer, 1936
Allodiaptomus rarus Reddy, Sanoamuang & Dumont, 1998
Allodiaptomus satanas (Brehm, 1952) – endemic to India, and listed as a vulnerable species on the IUCN Red List

References

Diaptomidae
Taxonomy articles created by Polbot